Dolichoderus erectilobus is a species of ant in the genus Dolichoderus. Described by Santschi in 1920, the species occurs in Vietnam and Thailand.

References

Dolichoderus
Hymenoptera of Asia
Insects of Vietnam
Insects described in 1920